Barbara Ann Hanawalt (born 4 March 1941) is an American historian and bestselling author. She specializes in English medieval social history.

Life 

She was born in New Brunswick, New Jersey. Her father was a university professor and her mother was a schoolteacher.

Career 

She received her bachelor's degree from Douglass College in 1963, a master's degree from the University of Michigan in 1964, and a Ph.D., also from the University of Michigan, in 1970.

She taught for a number of years at Indiana University and the University of Minnesota. She finally arrived at the Ohio State University as the King George III Chair of British History in 1999.

Awards 

She was named fellow of the Royal Historical Society and of the Wissenschaftskolleg zu Berlin and the Center for Advanced Studies at Princeton University.

Bibliography 

Some of her notable books are:

 The Middle Ages: An Illustrated History
 The Ties That Bound: Peasant Families in Medieval England
 The European World, 400-1450
 Growing Up in Medieval London: The Experience of Childhood in History
 The Wealth of Wives: Women, Law, and Economy in Late Medieval London
 Of Good and Ill Repute: Gender and Social Control in Medieval England
 Crime and Conflict in English Communities, 1300–1348

References

External links
 Ohio State University

1941 births
Living people
21st-century American historians
Ohio State University faculty
Douglass College alumni
Horace H. Rackham School of Graduate Studies alumni